Peace & Love was the largest music festival in Sweden, known for its humanitarian message, pervasive throughout the event. It started in Borlänge and ran from 1999 until the company filed for bankruptcy in 2013. 

The Peace & Love Crew announced that they would continue to do the much loved festival and in 2014 the festivals were back on under the name "Peace & Love World Forum". Since then it has expanded and has gone back to its old name "Peace & Love". The festival was cancelled in 2020 due to the ongoing pandemic, and shortly the festival declared bankruptcy.

History
The Peace & Love Festival was first held in 1999, as a reaction to the ongoing violence. The first festival was held at a club in central Borlänge, with about 900 attendees. Since then the festival was held at different locations in central Borlänge. The Peace & Love Festival was one of Scandinavia's fastest-growing festivals. In 2006 there were 15,000 visitors per day, with over 37,000 people attending in total. The 10th Peace & Love Festival was in 2008 and had a record of 25000 visitors, which made it the second biggest festival in Sweden.

2008
The tickets sold out as early as 23 May, and the festival got a lot of attention in nationwide media. 2008 was celebrated as the tenth festival. Artist that played, amongst others, were Sex Pistols [UK], Manu Chao [FR/ES], Kent, Teddybears, The Wombats [UK], Crystal Castles [CAN]. As a late surprise Roky Ericson and The Nomads was announced.

2009
The festival was held between 22 June and 27 June. This year Peace & Love became Sweden's biggest festival with 41 685 tickets sold. Some of the bands and artists were: Mötley Crüe (US), The Kooks (UK), Volbeat (DK), Milow (BE), Keane (UK), Thåström and Håkan Hellström.

2010
In 2010, the event took place between 28 June and 3 July - the same weekend as other major Scandinavian festivals Roskilde Festival and Hove Festival. The festival sold 42 000 tickets. This year, amongst others, Jay-Z, Lily Allen, Patti Smith, The Kooks and Kent played.

Theme
Each year, Peace & Love focuses on a subject that they theme the festival on. 

Past years' themes
2004 - Freedom of Speech
2005 - Environment
2006 - Democracy
2007 - Revolution
2008 - Wake Up!
2009 - Passion
2010 - Freedom
2011 - Courage, hope and love
2012 - A new World
2013 - Time For Peace - Cancelled
2014 - Diversity
2015 - Rise Of The Citizen

Artists
Over the years, artists such as Patti Smith, New York Dolls, Vitalic, Jay-Z, Tech N9ne, Lily Allen, Them Crooked Vultures, Alice Cooper, Slayer, W.A.S.P., Surkin, NOFX, Ed Harcourt, Vive la Fête, Hanoi Rocks, Motörhead, Cut Copy, and Khonnor, Familjen, Rootvälta, Den Svenska Björnstammen, Miike Snow, Name The Pet, The Cardigans, Thåström, Håkan Hellström, The Sounds, Mando Diao, Lars Winnerbäck, Ulf Lundell, The Hives, Looptroop, The Hellacopters and Silverbullit, among many others. The band which has played the most often at the Peace & Love festival is Sugarplum Fairy, a rock band from Borlänge whose two singers, Carl and Victor, are younger brothers of Gustaf Norén from the better-known band Mando Diao, also a rock band from Borlänge. Sugarplum Fairy has played every year since 2001.

Some of the bands that have played:

 1999 – Ken, The Ark, The Motorhomes 
 2000 – Joakim Thåström, Lars Winnerbäck, Mando Diao, Michael Monroe, The (International) Noise Conspiracy
 2001 – Backyard Babies, Rikard Wolff, Sator, Rootvälta
 2002 – The Latin Kings, Sophie Zelmani, Infinite Mass, The Sounds, Sugarplum Fairy
 2003 – Jakob Hellman, The Ark, The Sounds, Pain, Moneybrother, Steve Wynn, Rootvälta
 2004 – Motörhead, Hanoi Rocks, Broder Daniel, Marit Bergman, Lisa Miskovsky, Eldkvarn, Timbuktu
 2005 – Cut Copy, Ulf Lundell, Thomas Di Leva, The Hellacopters, Håkan Hellström, Nationalteatern, Khonnor
 2006 – Patti Smith, New York Dolls, The Cardigans, Ed Harcourt, Dia Psalma, Thåström, Håkan Hellström
 2007 – Iggy & The Stooges, Alice Cooper, Damien Rice, Jason Mraz, Backyard Babies, The Ark, Sahara Hotnights, Meshuggah, Dia Psalma, Mando Diao, Snook, Crashdïet, The Horrors, Lars Winnerbäck (secret act).
 2008 - Sex Pistols, Manu Chao, Thåström, Kent, Håkan Hellström, The Hives, In Flames, W.A.S.P, Jason Mraz, Suzanne Vega, The Hellacopters,  Millencolin, Adam Tensta, Pugh Rogefeldt, De Lyckliga Kompisarna, Roky Erickson (secret act).
 2009 - Turbonegro, Keane, Slagsmålsklubben, Lars Winnerbäck, Volbeat, Faith No More, Satyricon, Thåström, The Stranglers, Håkan Hellström, Pete Doherty, Mötley Crüe, Mando Diao, Carl Barât, Babyshambles, Chris Cornell, Monster Magnet, Razorlight, Psilodump.
2010 - Jay-Z, Them Crooked Vultures, Patti Smith, Lily Allen, The Kooks, Alice in Chains, John Fogerty, Mew, Vitalic, Familjen, Tech N9ne, Miike Snow, Surkin, Sick of it All, Hardcore Superstar, Brother Ali, Amanda Jenssen, Taylor Mali, Kent, The Hives
2011 - Bob Dylan, Bob Geldof, Jesse Jackson, Kings of Leon, Thirty Seconds to Mars, Ziggy Marley, M.I.A, The Strokes, Deadmau5
2012 - Rihanna, Skrillex, Regina Spektor, Mumford & Sons, Edguy, Dropkick Murphys, John Hiatt, Roxette, Kent, Billy Idol, The Shins, Christina Perri, Simple Plan
2013 - (Cancelled) Depeche Mode, Queens Of The Stone Age, Håkan Hellström, Iggy & The Stooges, Johnossi, First Aid Kit, Macklemore, Graveyard
2014 - Miss Li, Johnossi, Melissa Horn, Stefan Sundström, INVSN, Ebbot Lundberg
2015 - Veronica Maggio, D-A-D, Jill Johnson, Ola Salo, Doug Seeger, Petter, Timbuktu, Judah & The Lion

Peace & Love City bandy club
In 2016, the festival started a cooperation with the leading local bandy club, which led the bandy club to change its names from Borlänge Bandy to Peace & Love City.

References

External links
 Peace & Love homepage

Rock festivals in Sweden
Music festivals in Sweden
Music festivals established in 1999
Electronic music festivals in Sweden
Borlänge
Events in Dalarna County
Love
Peace
1999 establishments in Sweden